This is a list of people who have served as Custos Rotulorum of County Dublin.  Custos rotulorum (plural: custodes rotulorum; Latin for "keeper of the rolls") is a civic post which is recognised in some English-speaking jurisdictions. The position was later combined with that of Lord Lieutenant of Dublin.  

1661–1671 William St Lawrence, 12th Baron Howth
1671–?1685 William Brabazon, 3rd Earl of Meath (died 1685) 
1685–? Edward Brabazon, 4th Earl of Meath (died 1707)
?1709–1715 Chambre Brabazon, 5th Earl of Meath
1789–1821 Henry Lawes Luttrell, 2nd Earl of Carhampton 
1821–1822 Hans Hamilton
1823–1857 Sir Compton Domvile, 1st Baronet
1874–1892 Charles Stanley Monck, 4th Viscount Monck

See also
For later custodes rotulorum, see Lord Lieutenant of Dublin

References

Dublin